Turvo River may refer to several rivers in Brazil:

 Turvo River (Goiás)
 Turvo River (Grande River)
 Turvo River (Itapetininga River)
 Turvo River (Minas Gerais)
 Turvo River (Paraná)
 Turvo River (Paranapanema River)
 Turvo River (Pardo River)
 Turvo River (Rio de Janeiro)
 Turvo River (Rio Grande do Sul)